Cryptoblepharus bitaeniatus is a species of lizard in the family Scincidae. It is endemic to Europa Island in Mozambique.

References

Cryptoblepharus
Reptiles described in 1913
Reptiles of Mozambique
Endemic fauna of Mozambique
Taxa named by Oskar Boettger